Dichomeris fluctuans is a moth in the family Gelechiidae. It was described by Edward Meyrick in 1923. It is found in Peru.

The forewings are violet brown, the costal edge light yellowish. The stigmata are hardly darker, small, the plical beneath the first discal. There are two cloudy ochreous-yellowish dots on the costa towards the apex and indistinct darker marginal dots around the apex and termen. The hindwings are dark fuscous.

References

Moths described in 1923
fluctuans